The Wulayti or Wulaiti (from Arabic: ولاية, literally means territory or state ) is a term used to call a first generation of Arab immigrant born in the territory of their homeland. The term is more commonly used to refer to a Hadhrami immigrant.

See also
Muwallad.

References

Arab groups
Arab diaspora
Hadhrami people
Yemeni diaspora